Robyn Byrne (born 23 May 1997) is an Irish female professional darts player who currently plays in the World Darts Federation (WDF) and Professional Darts Corporation (PDC) events. Her biggest achievement to date was won the Winmau World Masters for girls, won a three gold medals in the WDF Europe Cup Youth and took silver medal in singles competition at the 2018 WDF Europe Cup. She took part in the WDF World Cup and WDF Europe Cup for several times.

Career
Byrne started playing darts in 2001, at the age of 3 or 4, plaguing her dad. In 2014 she won every girls competition at the 2014 WDF Europe Cup Youth, defeated Lidia Koltsova in singles competition by 4–2 in legs. Few months later she participated in the 2014 Winmau World Masters. In the girls' competition, she confidently triumphed, beat Beau Greaves by 4–0 in legs. In October 2015, she was selected by the national federation to participate in the 2015 WDF World Cup. In the singles competition, she only advanced to the second round, where she lost to Katie Bellerby by 3–4 in legs. In the pairs competition, together with Caroline Breen, she won a bronze medal. She also won the bronze medal in the team and overall classification.

She competed three times in the Winmau World Masters. In all tournaments, she lost in the first round. She took part in the 2016 WDF Europe Cup, but did not achieve satisfactory results. The following year, during the 2017 WDF World Cup, again together with Caroline Breen, she won the silver medal in the pairs competition. In the final they lost to Anastasia Dobromyslova and Marina Kononova from Russia by 1–6 in legs. In the singles competition, she advanced to the quarter-finals, where she lost to Aileen de Graaf by 1–5 in legs.

In 2018, Byrne achieved the greatest success so far in senior tournaments, winning a silver medal in singles competition during the 2018 WDF Europe Cup. On the way to the finals, she defeated, among others Deta Hedman and Rhian Griffiths. She lost to Fiona Gaylor in the final, by 4–7 in legs. In the pairs and team competitions, she finished in the quarter-finals. From 2020, he takes part in tournaments organized by the Professional Darts Corporation (PDC). In March 2022, he played in the Women's Series final, where she lost to Lisa Ashton by 3–5 in legs. She remained at a good level to the end of the season, taking 11th place in the ranking. He also continues to compete in the World Darts Federation tournaments.

At the end of September 2022, she was selected by the national federation to participate in the 2022 WDF Europe Cup. On the second day of the tournament, she advanced to the quarter-finals of the singles competition, where she lost to eventual gold medalist Beau Greaves by 2–5 in legs. On the third day, she advanced to the quarter-finals of the pairs competition, where she played together with Katie Sheldon. They lost to Lerena Rietbergen and Anca Zijlstra from Netherlands by 1–4 in legs. In the team tournament, she was eliminated in the quarter-finals.

Performance timeline

References

Living people
1997 births
British Darts Organisation players
Irish darts players
Professional Darts Corporation women's players